The Outer Drive Bridge, also known as the Link Bridge, is a double-deck bascule bridge carrying Lake Shore Drive across the Chicago River in Chicago, Illinois, United States.  Construction was started in 1929 and was completed in 1937 as one of the Public Works Administration's infrastructure projects in Chicago. The bridge is officially named the Franklin Delano Roosevelt Memorial Bridge to honor the centennial anniversary of the birth of Franklin Delano Roosevelt. It was planned by the Chicago Plan Commission, using Hugh E. Young as the consulting engineer, was designed by the Strauss Engineering Company, built by the American Bridge Company, and erected by Ketler and Elliot Company.  It crosses near the mouth of the Chicago River.

Significance/purpose

The building of this bridge was meant to create many jobs for Chicagoans and ease traffic flow on Michigan Avenue and in the Loop. In 1937 this structure was the longest, widest, and heaviest bascule bridge in the world. The Outer Drive itself, now known as Lake Shore Drive, links the south side to the north side of the city, running along the western shore of Lake Michigan. It extends from its origin in Jackson Park on the South Side of the city to the Loop, across this Outer Drive Bridge over the Chicago River, to its eventual terminus at Hollywood Avenue and Sheridan Road in Edgewater on the city's North Side.

Funds
While the completion of the Outer Drive was considered one of the most important projects in the PWA it took many years to complete. A main issue was funding. Due to a lack of provided security by Chicago Park Districts, the allotment for the bridge was revoked until the districts were all in position to comply. The total cost of the Outer Drive is estimated at $11,563,000.

Economic justification
Calculations based on a traffic flow of 40,000 vehicles per day on a saving of eight minutes between Oak Street and Seventh Street, made possible by the use of the bridge rather than Michigan Avenue. The delay cost estimated to be one cent per car per minute (60 cents per hour for the value of time or the value of fuel saved) resulted in a savings in vehicle operation of $584,000 per annum; that amount capitalized at 5% would indicate that $23,360,000 could properly be spent to eliminate this delay, in the eyes of the decision makers at the time of the construction. From the perspective of engineering economics, this savings calculation justified the Outer Drive bridge project, showing a possible saving of $11,797,000.

Bridge operation
According to Engineering News-Record, "Each leaf is to be operated by two sets of gear trains, consisting of four sets of gear reductions. Each gear train is connected to two 100-horsepower main operating motors, only one of which is to be used at a time. The time required for opening or closing the bridge against a  wind is stated to be 57.6 seconds, of which 10 seconds is for acceleration and 2.86 seconds for deceleration. The main operating racks are bolted to the underside of the outside trusses, the pitch radius being .

Heavy locking devices are provided at the center of the bridge and at the rigid in its closed position. The center lock in addition to holding the leaves together in their closed position, also transmits live load shear from one leaf to the other. This center lock consists of a set of four female castings bolted to the river end of one leaf, and a second set of four male units bolted to the river end of the other leaf, all castings being on the centerlines of the trusses. The male unit consists of two castings forming a toggle.

Heel or rear locks are necessary to prevent the leaves from opening when live loads pass over the part of the bridge between the trunnions and the rear break in the floor. Each leaf is provided with two pairs of rear locks, each pair being placed between the inside and outside trusses. The four locks of a leaf are connected by shafting, and operation by means of two 15-horsepower motors set either side of the centerline of the bridge" (April 22, 1937).

See also
List of bridges documented by the Historic American Engineering Record in Illinois
Quarantine Speech

References

"A Record Size Bascule," Engineering News-Record, v. 118 (April 22, 1937): 583-587.
"Chicago Gets Added PWA Funds for Outer Drive Completion," Engineering News-Record, v. 115 (December 5, 1935): 795-796.
"Continuous Girders Top Rigid Frame Viaduct Bents," Engineering News-Record, V. 118 (May 6, 1937): 671-673.
"Lakefront Boulevard Link Forms Milestone in Chicago Plan," Engineering News-Record, v. 118 (April 15, 1937): 546-548.

External links 

 

Bridges in Chicago
Bridges completed in 1937
Bascule bridges in the United States
Historic American Engineering Record in Chicago
Road bridges in Illinois
Pedestrian bridges in Illinois
Truss bridges in the United States